River Oaks station is an at-grade light rail station located in the center median of First Street at its intersection with River Oaks Parkway, after which the station is named, in San Jose, California. The station is owned by Santa Clara Valley Transportation Authority (VTA) and is served by the Blue Line and the Green Line of the VTA light rail system.

Services

Location 
The station is located in San Jose, California in the center median of 1st Street at River Oaks Parkway.  The stop serves its immediate San Jose neighborhood, which includes VTA's administration office, as well as a nearby portion of Santa Clara opposite the Guadalupe River, accessible via a bicycle-pedestrian bridge.  The bridge makes River Oaks one of VTA's few North San Jose light rail stops to serve a residential neighborhood, as North San Jose is almost entirely industrial.

It is within walking distance of River Oaks Park.

Platform layout

References

External links 

Santa Clara Valley Transportation Authority light rail stations
Santa Clara Valley Transportation Authority bus stations
Railway stations in San Jose, California
Railway stations in the United States opened in 1987
1987 establishments in California